Mikhail Varnakov (born June 25, 1957, in Gorky, Soviet Union) is a retired ice hockey player who played in the Soviet Hockey League.  He played for HC Torpedo Nizhny Novgorod.  He was inducted into the Russian and Soviet Hockey Hall of Fame in 1985.

External links

Russian and Soviet Hockey Hall of Fame bio

1957 births
Living people
Sportspeople from Nizhny Novgorod
Soviet ice hockey left wingers
Soviet expatriate ice hockey players
HC CSKA Moscow players
Torpedo Nizhny Novgorod players
VEU Feldkirch players
EV Füssen players
SC Riessersee players
Soviet expatriate sportspeople in Austria
Russian ice hockey left wingers